Anomalopus verreauxii, also known commonly as the three-clawed worm-skink or Verreaux's skink, is a species of lizard in the family Scincidae. The species is endemic to Australia.

Etymology
The specific name, verreauxii (masculine, genitive, singular), is in honor of one of the Verreaux brothers, Édouard Verreaux and Jules Verreaux, who were French naturalists and taxidermists.

Geographic range
A. verreauxii is found in New South Wales and Queensland, Australia.

Habitat
The preferred natural habitat of A. verreauxii is forest.

Description
A. verreauxii has three clawed toes on the front leg, and it has no toes on the back leg.

Reproduction
A. verreauxii is oviparous.

References

Further reading
Cogger HG (2014). Reptiles and Amphibians of Australia, Seventh Edition. Clayton, Victoria, Australia: CSIRO Publishing. xxx + 1,033pp. .
Duméril AMC, Duméril AHA (1851). Catalogue méthodique de la collection des reptile du Muséum d'Histoire Naurelle de Paris. Paris: Gide et Baudry / Roret. 224 pp. (Anomalopus verreauxii, new species, p. 185). (in French).
Greer AE, Cogger HG (1985). "Systematics of the reduce-limbed and limbless skinks currently assigned to the genus Anomalopus (Lacertilia: Scincidae)". Records of the Australian Museum 37 (1): 11–54. (Anomalopus verreauxii, pp. 16–19, Figures 4–5)
Wilson, Steve; Swan, Gerry (2013). A Complete Guide to Reptiles of Australia, Fourth Edition. Sydney: New Holland Publishers. 522 pp. .

Anomalopus
Reptiles described in 1851
Taxa named by André Marie Constant Duméril
Taxa named by Auguste Duméril